John K. Carson (born September 21, 1971) is an American politician from Georgia. Carson is a Republican member of Georgia House of Representatives for District 46.

References

Republican Party members of the Georgia House of Representatives
21st-century American politicians
Living people
1971 births